

Heathured or Hathored was a medieval Bishop of Worcester. He was consecrated in 781. He died either in 798 or perhaps in 800.

Citations

References

External links
 

Bishops of Worcester
8th-century English bishops